Lynda Marlène Gauzé (born 11 June 1990) is an Ivorian footballer who plays as a defender for Juventus de Yopougon and the Ivory Coast women's national team.

International career
Gauzé has already capped with Ivory Coast at senior level.

See also
List of Ivory Coast women's international footballers

References

1990 births
Living people
Women's association football defenders
Ivorian women's footballers
Footballers from Abidjan
Ivory Coast women's international footballers